Mahvash, born Masoumeh Azizi Borujerdi, was an Iranian singer, dancer, film actress and stage performer. She came from a poor family and was lauded as a singer (performer) of the people in the 1950s.

Early life and early career  
Mahvash was born Masoumeh Azizi Borujerdi in Borujerd, Iran to a poor family, when Mahvash was a teenager the family came to Tehran. At an early age, Mahvash lost her mother.  Later she went on to perform in Tehran's cabarets and cafes in the late 1940s to early 1950s and drew large support from the working people. 

However, there is confusion around her biography, and different accounts of what type of performances were happening at this age and where. The most common story is that she performed risqué songs in the cabarets, on the radio and in movies. Another prevalent story is she began in a classical ruhowzi dance troupe as a dancer, pishparde singer, and actress; and she married a violinist who secured her entertainment engagements.

Career 
She gained the admiration of the masses’ by articulating in her songs the problems, difficulties, and frustrations of the common people, struggles which she knew very well. Her most famous songs involved a call and response-style singing with her male audience.

She published a book in 1957 which she termed an "autobiography" which was entitled Secrets of Sexual Fulfillment. This book was more of a sex manual had pictures of her in a bathing suit and was published and widely distributed despite being prosecuted for the book in June 1960. It seems that Mahvash's ability to speak to the marginalized majority absolved her of her forays into prostitution and other publicly indecent behavior.

When Mahvash died in a car accident in 1961, her public funeral went down in Iran's history as the largest of its day, with thousands of Iranians on the streets to mark her passing. Iranian religious authorities were unwilling to accept burying her in a Muslim cemetery because as an entertainer she was considered "unclean" and "unchaste", however when the large amount of mourners celebrated her passing they relented.

She is buried in the Ibn Babawayh Cemetery in Tehran.

Filmography

Acting 
 1956 – , with director Sardar Saker
 1956 – , with director 
 1957 – 
1957 – , starring with 
 1959 – , with director George Ovadiah
 1959 – , with director 
 1961 – What's the Difference, with director Reza Karimi

Singing 
 1962 – , featured singing and dancing by Mahvash, with director Abbas Shabaviz

See also 
 Persian dance
 Persian pop music
 Persian theatre

References

External links
 
 Video of Mahvash dancing (film name unknown)
 Video featuring Mahvash, Afat and Vigen performing

1920 births
1961 deaths
20th-century Iranian women singers
Iranian sex workers
Iranian erotic dancers
Iranian film actresses
People from Borujerd
Singers from Tehran
Iranian women dancers
Iranian folk singers
20th-century Iranian actresses